The women's volleyball tournament at the 2022 Mediterranean Games started on 26 June and is scheduled to end on 4 July at the Bir El Djir Sports Hall in Bir El Djir and the Hamou Boutlélis Sports Palace in Oran, Algeria.

Participating teams

 (host)

Venues

Preliminary round
All times are local (UTC+1).

Group A 

|}

|}

Group B 

|}

|}

Group C 

|}

|}

Final round

Classification bracket

Classification 5th–8th

|}

Seventh place game

|}

Fifth place game

|}

Championship bracket

Quarterfinals

|}

Semifinals

|}

Third place game

|}

Final

|}

Final standings

See also

Volleyball at the Mediterranean Games
Volleyball at the 2022 Mediterranean Games – Men's tournament

References

External links
2022 Mediterranean Games

Sports at the 2022 Mediterranean Games
Mediterranean Games